Parecattil is an Indian surname.  Notable people with the surname include:

 Joseph Parecattil (1912–1987), Indian prelate of the Syro-Malabar Catholic Church
 Manoj Varghese Parecattil (born 1981), Indian film director and writer

Indian surnames